Jean-Yves Béziau (born January 15, 1965, in Orléans, France) is a professor and researcher of the Brazilian Research Council (CNPq) at the University of Brazil in Rio de Janeiro.

Career
Béziau works in the field of logic—in particular, paraconsistent logic, the square of opposition and universal logic.  He holds a Maîtrise in Philosophy from Pantheon-Sorbonne University, a DEA in Philosophy from Pantheon-Sorbonne University, a PhD in Philosophy from the University of São Paulo, a MSc and a PhD in Logic and Foundations of Computer Science from Paris Diderot University.

Béziau is the editor-in-chief of the journal Logica Universalis and of the South American Journal of Logic—an online, open-access journal—as well as of the Springer book series Studies in Universal Logic. He is also the editor of College Publication's book series Logic PhDs

He has launched four major international series of events: UNILOG (World Congress and School on Universal Logic), SQUARE (World Congress on the Square of Opposition), WOCOLOR (World Congress on Logic and Religion), LIQ (Logic in Question).

Béziau created the World Logic Day on January 14, 2019
 and successfully submitted the proposal 

to have this day in the UNESCO Calendar of International days.

Comments on homosexuality and political correctness 

In 2014, the academic journal Synthese published an article in which Béziau links "logical pluralism" to homosexuality and complains about the "absurdity and hypocrisy" of "political correctness":

Selected publications 
 "What is paraconsistent logic?"  In D. Batens et al. (eds.), Frontiers of Paraconsistent Logic, Research Studies Press, Baldock, 2000, pp. 95–111.  
 Handbook of Paraconsistency (ed. with Walter Carnielli and  Dov Gabbay).  London: College Publication, 2007.  
 "Semantic computation of truth based on associations already learned" (with Patrick Suppes), Journal of Applied Logic, 2 (2004), pp. 457–467.
 "From paraconsistent logic to universal logic", Sorites,  12 (2001), pp. 5–32.
 Logica Universalis: Towards a General Theory of Logic (ed.)  Basel: Birkhäuser Verlag, 2005, Second Edition 2007.  
 "Logic is not logic", 'Abstracta' 6 (2010), pp. 73–102.
  "The power of the hexagon", Logica Universalis, 6 (2012), pp. 1–43.
  "History of truth-values",  in D.M.Gabbay and J.Woods (eds) Handbook of the History of Logic, Vol. 11 - Logic: a history of its central concepts, Elsevier, Amsterdam, 2012, pp. 233–305
 The Square of Opposition: a General Framework for Cognition (ed. with Gillman Payette).  Bern: Peter Lang, 2012.  
 "The new rising of the square of opposition", in J.-Y.Béziau and D.Jacquette (eds), Around and Beyond the Square of Opposition, Birkhäuser, Basel, 2012, pp. 6–24.
 La pointure du symbole (ed.)  Paris: Petra, 2014.  
  "The relativity and universality of logic", Synthese, 192 (2015), pp 1939–1954.
"Logical Autobiography 50", in A.Koslow and A.Buchsbaum (eds), The Road to Universal Logic, Vol.2, Birkhäuser, Basel, 2015, pp. 19–104.
"MANY 1 - A Transversal Imaginative Journey across the Realm of Mathematics", in M.Chakraborty and M.Friend (eds), Special Issue on Mathematical Pluralism of the Journal of Indian Council of Philosophical Research, May 2017, Volume 34, Issue 2, pp 259–287.
"Being aware of rational animals", in G.Dodig-Crnkovic and R.Giovagnoli (eds), Representation and Reality: Humans, Animals and Machines, Springer International Publishing, Cham, 2017, pp. 319–331.
"A Chromatic Hexagon of Psychic Dispositions", in M.Silva (ed), How Colours Matter to Philosophy, Springer International Publishing, Cham, 2017, pp. 273–388.
"An Analogical Hexagon", International Journal of Approximate Reasoning, 94 (2018), pp. 1–17.
"The Pyramid of Meaning", in J.Ceuppens, H.Smessaert, J. van Craenenbroeck and G.Vanden Wyngaerd (eds), A Coat of Many Colours - D60, Brussels, 2018.
"An unexpected feature of classical propositional logic in the Tractatus", in G.Mras, P.Weingartner and B.Ritter (eds), Philosophy of Logic and Mathematics: Proceedings of the 41st International Ludwig Wittgenstein Symposium, De Gruyter, Berlin, Munich, Boston, 2019.
"Is God Paraconsistent?" (with Newton da Costa) in Beyond Faith and Rationality Essays on Logic, Religion and Philosophy, Springer International Publishing, Cham, 2020, pp. 321–333
"Metalogic, Schopenhauer and Universal Logic",  in J.Lemanski (ed), Language, Logic, and Mathematics in Schopenhauer, Birkhäuser, Basel, 2020, pp. 207–257.
"The Mystery of the Fifth Logical Notion (Alice in the Wonderful Land of Logical Notions)", Studia Humana, Volume 9:3/4 (2020), pp. 19–36.

References

External links
 Jean-Yves Beziau's personal homepage

1965 births
Mathematical logicians
Living people
Logicians
Scientists from Orléans
Paraconsistent logic